Bayswater is a suburb located on the North Shore of Auckland, New Zealand. It lies on a peninsula which juts into the Waitemata Harbour. The suburb is in the North Shore ward, one of the thirteen administrative divisions of Auckland Council.

Demographics

Bayswater had a population of 2,865 at the 2018 New Zealand census, an increase of 42 people (1.5%) since the 2013 census, and an increase of 222 people (8.4%) since the 2006 census. There were 1,038 households, comprising 1,365 males and 1,503 females, giving a sex ratio of 0.91 males per female. The median age was 37.1 years (compared with 37.4 years nationally), with 564 people (19.7%) aged under 15 years, 669 (23.4%) aged 15 to 29, 1,281 (44.7%) aged 30 to 64, and 354 (12.4%) aged 65 or older.

Ethnicities were 80.6% European/Pākehā, 11.7% Māori, 6.3% Pacific peoples, 10.3% Asian, and 3.8% other ethnicities. People may identify with more than one ethnicity.

The percentage of people born overseas was 32.5, compared with 27.1% nationally.

Although some people chose not to answer the census's question about religious affiliation, 54.6% had no religion, 32.9% were Christian, 0.3% had Māori religious beliefs, 0.5% were Hindu, 0.7% were Muslim, 1.0% were Buddhist and 2.3% had other religions.

Of those at least 15 years old, 783 (34.0%) people had a bachelor's or higher degree, and 222 (9.6%) people had no formal qualifications. The median income was $43,000, compared with $31,800 nationally. 684 people (29.7%) earned over $70,000 compared to 17.2% nationally. The employment status of those at least 15 was that 1,257 (54.6%) people were employed full-time, 315 (13.7%) were part-time, and 72 (3.1%) were unemployed.

History
Bayswater was originally named O'Neill's Point after the first European settlers in the area, brothers Allan and James O'Neill. Originally settling at the point (which still bears their name) at the end of the peninsula in the 1840s, by the 1850s the O'Neills owned the entire peninsula. Some time later the area was renamed Bayswater after one of the more expensive new inner suburbs of London. The London Bayswater is located north of Hyde Park and was developed during the middle of the 19th century. The name was chosen for the Auckland suburb to evoke a sense of style as well as being a straight description of its physical location as a seaside development.

Education

References

External links
 Bayswater School website
 Photographs of Bayswater held in Auckland Libraries' heritage collections.

Suburbs of Auckland
North Shore, New Zealand
Populated places around the Waitematā Harbour